La Prisonnière (The Prisoner) may refer to:

 La Prisonnière (1968 film), the final work of French director Henri-Georges Clouzot
La prisonnière (The Captive (play)), a 1926 play by Édouard Bourdet
 a novel by Marcel Proust, fifth volume of In Search of Lost Time
 an autobiography by Malika Oufkir, originally published in French, and translated into English as Stolen Lives: Twenty Years in a Desert Jail